The Ottoman census records (defterleri) of 1454/5 and 1506 of the Sanjak of Trikala are the only sources depicting the residential and economic structure of the region of Metsovo during the early Ottoman period.

Timar of Metsovo
In the 1454/55 census, the tax district of the timar of Metsovo (karye-i Miçova), fell under the hâss of Turahanoglu Ömer Bey, lord of the sanjak of Trikala, and comprised the settlements Nihori, Kato Kitona, Epano Kitona, Tiravatişte, Vitinos and Mila. In the 1506 census, the timar of Metsovo had been taken over by Bali Bey and comprised the settlements Brostile, Nihori or Pethori, Kato Peltonya, Epano Peltonya, Tiravatişte, Vitonoş and Milya or Milina.

Population
The 1454/55 census shows 700 fully taxable households (hâne), 41 widows (bîve) and 52 single men (mücerred). In 1506, there are 442 fully taxable households (hâne), 43 or 46 single men and 35 widows. These figures show that the area is a strong demographic zone, which was much more densely populated than the largest settlements of the sanjak of Trikala.

Resident occupations
The types of revenues recorded at the time indicate that the residents of Metsovo were occupied with various aspects of farming  at the time. In addition to livestock breeding, they also cultivated grains, nuts, and grapes, kept bees and bred silkworm.

Sources

Μ. Delibaşi -M. Arikan, Sûret i Defter-i Sancak-i Tirhala I, Türk Tarih Kurumu, Ankara 2001, pp. 26–27
Th. Dasoulas, Agrotikes koinonies tou oreinou chorou kata tin othomaniki periodo: o georgikos kosmos tis “Choras Metzovou” (18os -19os ai.) [Agrarian society in highland areas during the Ottoman period: farmer's population of the land of Metzovo (18th c. - 19th c.)], publ. EADD (National Archive of PhD Theses, http://hdl.handle.net/10442/hedi/17726), 2009, pp. 137–139, 322-329

Censuses in the Ottoman Empire
Metsovo
Ottoman Greece